is a former Japanese professional baseball infielder for the Chunichi Dragons in Japan's Nippon Professional Baseball. He also played for Team Japan at the 2008 Olympics.

Morino retired in 2017 and served as the Dragons' second team batting coach until the end of the 2019 season.

References

External links

 Career statistics - NPB.jp 

1978 births
Living people
Baseball people from Kanagawa Prefecture
Nippon Professional Baseball infielders
Chunichi Dragons players
Baseball players at the 2008 Summer Olympics
Olympic baseball players of Japan
Japanese baseball coaches
Nippon Professional Baseball coaches